Najwa Karam (born February, 26, 1966) is a Lebanese multi-platinum singer, songwriter, and fashion icon. Dubbed Shams el-Ghinnieh ("The Sun of Song"), Karam is noted for her powerful Mawwal-skilled vocals. She has gained an international audience due to her distinct blend of traditional Lebanese music and contemporary sounds, which has contributed to the spread of the Lebanese dialect in Arabic Music. Having sold tens of millions of records, Najwa Karam is one of the highest selling Arabic language singers, with her greatest album sales successes in the years of 1999, 2000, 2001, 2003, and 2008. In 2023, Karam boasts a social media following of nearly 40 million followers across Facebook, Instagram and Twitter. Karam was named to Forbes 50 Over 50: Europe, Middle East And Africa 2023. She continues to frequently perform throughout the Arab world and internationally.

In 2011, Karam debuted as a judge on the reality competition television series Arabs Got Talent; she has since appeared on all six of its seasons. In 2020, she appeared as a coach on the first season of MBC's The Voice Senior. In 2017, Forbes Middle East ranked Karam number 5 on the list of "The Top 100 Arab Celebrities" with over 26.58 million social media followers at the time. In 2018, Cosmopolitan included Karam on their list of "The 15 Most Inspiring Women In The Middle East", and Forbes included her on their list of the "Top 10 of Arab Stars On The Global Stage". In 2021, she was named to Forbes Middle East’s Arab Music Stars list of 50 of MENA’s most streamed and followed active musicians.

Karam rose to stardom throughout the 1990s, earning the moniker Shams el-Ghinnieh ("The Sun of Song"), from her eponymous album. Her other successful '90s albums include Naghmet Hob, Ma Bassmahlak, Maghroumeh, and Rouh Rouhi. In 2000, Karam's tenth album Oyoun Qalbi became her highest-selling album. In 2001 her album Nedmaneh sold millions of copies worldwide, earning Karam a Murex d'Or award for Best Arabic Artist and Rotana Records awards including, Artist of the Year, Album of the Year, and Highest-Selling Album of the Year. By the time her album Saharni was released in 2003, she had established herself as one of the most prominent Arabic singers and as a Middle Eastern pop icon. Throughout the late 2000s, Karam's commercial success endured via her albums, Hayda Haki, Am Bemzah Ma'ak, and Khallini Shoufak. Karam frequently worked with the renowned musician and composer Melhem Barakat and collaborated with the legendary singer, Wadih el Safi on their critically acclaimed 2004 duet titled, W Kberna ("We Grow Old Together"). In 2011, Karam collaborated with Sony Entertainment and Rotana to produce the Arab World's first 3D music video for her song, "Ma Fi Noum" from her record Hal Layle... Ma Fi Nom. In 2012, Karam walked the Red Carpet at the 65th Cannes Film Festival. Karam has since released well-received singles and music videos as well as her latest studio album, Menni Elak, in 2017. In 2019, Karam's single, Maloun Abou L Echeq, became a commercial and critical success with its music video becoming one of the highest-viewed Arabic music videos on Youtube.

Life and career

The early years and Layali Lubnan: 1985–1988 
Najwa Karam Karam was born in Zahlé, Lebanon to a family of Lebanese Melkite Christians. She is the youngest daughter of Karam Karam (who died 7 September 2013) and Barbara Chahine Karam. She has an older sister, Salwa, and three older brothers, Tony, Jean, and Nicolas (who died 28 February 2017, aged 58). Karam spent her childhood in Zahlé, under the care of her parents and older brothers. From an early age, Karam was known among her friends and relatives for her powerful singing voice.

Her parents emphasized the need for an education and a stable career, so Karam attended secondary school at Jesus the Angel College. Then, she went on to earn a bachelor's degree in philosophy. Karam worked as a Geography and Arabic teacher at Eastern College in Zahlé, Lebanon, for two years.

Even though she started her career as a teacher, Karam remained interested in music. In 1985, against her father's wishes, she participated in a television singing competition called "Layali Lubnan" (Lebanese Nights). Showcasing her powerful vocals through the traditional Lebanese Mawwal, Karam won the first place, Gold Medal, along with modest public exposure and her father's approval. Following her success, Karam studied at the Lebanese Institute of Music for four years. During this time, she was mentored by the two famous Lebanese composers, Zaki Nasif and Fouad Awad. In 1987, she participated in another television contest named Laylat Haz, where she gained greater exposure that would prepare her for her first attempt at breaking into the Arabic music industry in 1989.

The beginning: 1989–1993

Shams el-Ghinnieh, (The Sun of Song)
In 1989, Karam's first studio album, Ya Habayeb, was released by a then-little-known record label, Relax-in International. The album contained seven tracks, all in the traditional Lebanese traditional/folkloric style. Due to her previous exposure to the Lebanese public, the album was well-received in Lebanon but did not receive much attention from the rest of the Arab world.

After a three-year hiatus from music-making, Karam returned to the scene with her follow-up album, Shams el-Ghinnieh. The album title was inspired by her nickname, "Shams el-Ghinnieh" ("sun of the song"). This nickname was given to her by the Lebanese people and media because of her vocal abilities. The album was recorded by another small record company, CM. The style of the album was more romantic and contemporary, in comparison to Karam's debut album, Ya Habayeb, which was more traditional. Shams el-Ghinnieh was received very well by the Lebanese public.

Ana Ma'akon (I'm With You)
The next year, in 1993, Karam signed with another record label for her new album. This time it was an even less-known Saudi Arabian company. The new album was called Ana Ma'akon ("I am with you"), not reflecting Karam's artistic identity. The album was classic in style and quite different from Shams el-Ghinnieh. Despite her discontent, she had no choice but to release it, bound by a contract with her production company. As expected, the album failed to do as well as Shams el-Ghinnieh. Poor marketing and lack of resources did not help much either and were blamed for the low sales of the album. It remains Karam's least-known album.

Domination: 1994–1999 

Karam's fortunes took a turn for the better when she was approached by the Middle East's largest recording label, Rotana, owned by the Saudi Arabian Prince Al-Waleed bin Talal. An agreement between the parties was made, and Karam was now on Rotana's roster.

Work on a new album began immediately. Expert poets, writers, and composers were enlisted to help Karam make a fresh new musical image for herself to revitalize public interest and draw attention from the wider Arab audience. By mid-1994, an album consisting of eight new songs had been compiled and was ready to be released to the Middle East. Naghmet Hob (The Rhythm of Love) fused Lebanese tradition with Arab pop. Its catchy Lebanese dance song "Law Habaytek" ("If I Loved You") was an instant hit, introducing Najwa Karam to all of the Middle East. The song and its video clip dominated the Arabian charts. Its follow-up hits from the same album were "Wrood Eddar" ("Roses of the Garden") and "Elala" ("La La"), which received similar success.

The wide success of Naghmet Hob gave Karam a chance to do a concert tour and attain a number of awards, including a prize from the Lebanese Broadcasting Association for the Best Artist of 1994.

Karam had been thrust to the top of the Arabic music scene in less than a year, and was now constantly in the public eye. In 1995, she started work on her second Rotana album, her fifth release in total. It was titled Ma Bassmahlak and closely followed the traditional style of Naghmet Hob. The main difference was the lyrical and vocal nature of the tracks which had more depth. Riding the wave of her celebrity, two of the songs were hits, namely "Ma Bassmahlak" ("I Won't Allow You") and "Hakam el-Qady" ("The Judge Has Spoken").

Hazi Helo, (I'm Lucky)
With five albums under her belt, the latter two of which witnessed groundbreaking success, Karam has a become familiar face in the Arabic music industry. On 16 June 1996, she released her newest album entitled Hazi Helo ("I'm Lucky"). The title track, "Hazi Helo" and three other songs, "Khayarouni", "Ala Mahlak" and "El-Ghorbil", were the most popular from the album.

Following the release of Hazi Helo, Karam set off on a large-scale world concert tour, which would take in many Arab states, parts of Europe, and America. She found a number of fans in the U.S., and performed many successful sold-out concerts. To honor her success in the US Karam was presented with the Key to the City of Chicago.

Ma Hada La Hada (Nobody is for anybody) and Maghroumeh (In Love)
After the sell-out world tour, Karam returned to Lebanon with a fresh mind and new song ideas. And so work began on her next studio album – Ma Hada La Hada. The tracks on the album were quite different from those of Karam's previous albums, with a more contemporary sound. For example, the song "El Helw" was heavily influenced by foreign beats and synthesized melodies. Three months before the album's official release, the song El Tahady was distributed to the Arabic radio stations. By the time of the album's release, the song's popularity had dwindled, and Ma Hada La Hadas relatively poor sales were attributed to this factor. However, the title track did become quite popular. It had harmonious musical arrangements which used the traditional Lebanese instrument the Qanoun, along with other traditional instruments such as the violin and the accordion. These musical styles, along with an uplifting song topic and a powerful "mini-movie" video clip made the song a huge hit.

The 1998 release, Maghroumeh, marked Karam's "official" transition from purely traditional Lebanese artist to the blend of traditional and contemporary Arabic that she is famous for today. It had poetic Arabic lyrics sung with Karam's trademark power and authority; extensive use of Arabic instruments (trumbakke, mijwiz, zamour, tabal, etc.) and contemporary ones; and a brand new look for the album cover. Maghroumeh was another success from Karam. The title track, "Maghroumeh" ("I Am in Love"), was shot as a video clip, and was the biggest hit off the album, hitting number one on most radio stations in the region. Other hits were the feisty "Ghamza" ("The Wink"), and the sad love song "Noqta al-Satr" ("Somewhere along the line").

Rouh Rouhi (My soul my soul)
The new year brought about a number of changes in Karam's career life. Her new album was set to be released in the summer, and her personal changes were showing in her new album Rouh Rouhi. It was similar to the Maghroumeh album but had a number of tweaks in the vocal and musical styles. The musical arrangements were heavily detailed and technical, and the lyrics were more poetic than all other Karam albums. The tracks "Ariftu Albi La Meen" ("Do you know who my heart belongs to?"), "Atchana" ("Thirsty"), and the title track, "Rouh Rouhi" ("Soul of my Soul") were the major hits off the album, the latter two being shot as music videos. Many other songs succeeded like "Kif Bdawik" ("How Do I Treat You?)", and "Ma Berda Ghayrak" ("I Don't Accept Anyone Beside You").

 2000–2004 
Another year, another change for Najwa Karam. This time it came about in the form of a music album called Oyoun Qalbi. Oyoun Qalbi was a more romantic, reflective body of work compared to Karam's previous albums. Its major included "Majboura" ("I Have to") which had a modern jazz influence, and the "power ballets", "Oyoun Qalbi" ("Sweetheart") and "Khaleek al Ard" ("Stay down to Earth"). A music video was made for the Najwa 2000 megamix, which contained samples from each song on the Oyoun Qalbi album. The album sold over 5 million copies, topping charts. It holds the up-to-date record for the best-selling Arabic album of all time.

In 2001, Karam made her record-breaking release Nedmaneh. It sold over 4 million copies worldwide and is one of Karam's most acclaimed albums to date. It followed on from the style of music first presented by Karam in Oyoun Qalbi, and further experimented with new styles and sounds. The song "Aaskah" ("Falling in love") was an enormous hit, hitting number one all over the Middle East, and was also quite popular abroad. It was a more playful and vibrant song than most of Karam's previous work, with a strong bass line, and a distinct oriental influence. It was quite different from any Arabic song at the time and appealed to a wide range of audiences. The success of album Nedmaneh brought about a number of awards, including a coveted Murex D'or for "Best Arabic Artist" award, and three special awards from Karam's production company, Rotana: "Artist of the Year", "Album of the Year" and "Highest Selling Album".

To further Rotana's crediting of Karam's successes, an honouring assemble was held on Saturday, 23 June 2001, where Karam was awarded for her achievements throughout her singing career and for the huge success of Nedmaneh. The ceremony was held at the Venesia Hotel, Beirut, Lebanon. In attendance were the Lebanese Minister of Information, Ghazi Al-Aredi who was representing the President of the Lebanese Republic, Émile Lahoud, prominent singer Wadih el Safi, acclaimed composer Elias Rahbani and a number of journalists and reporters. During the night, Karam sang some of her hits (old and new), and was presented with numerous medals and trophies. The recording was released on a special edition CD (Live in Concert), along with a compilation CD of Najwa's hits from 1989–2000 titled The Very Best Of Najwa Karam.

Karam's 2002 album, Tahamouni, was far removed from the "easy-going" contemporary feel of Oyoun Qalbi and Nedmaneh, and audiences noticed. The album was intended to get back in touch with a more youthful audience from other Arab nations, with whom had taken slight dis-interest in Karam's music from the late 90s. This was shown through songs like Tahamouni (They accused me) which included attempts at rapping, and Ew'a Tekoun Ze'alt (I hope you're not mad at me) which seemed to have a complete Western influence. The songs had a youthful sound.

Saharni, (He Charmed Me)

In late 2002, Karam began meeting with the Lebanese "tarab" star, Wadih el Safi (born 1919). El Safi had known Karam for a while and had been impressed with her vocal talents. The two of them decided to make a duet together, depicting the trials of a father-daughter relationship. The song was titled W Kberna (We grow old together) and was an epic ballad in which both vocalists showed immense vocal range and depth. W Kberna was a success as the lyrics were easy to relate to, and it teamed two of the region's most prominent artists together.

Taking this success, Karam got back to the drawing board for a new album. Months were spent piecing together lyrics and arrangements, and by mid-2003, the album was ready for release. Rotana set up a large launch party in Downtown Beirut, where over fifteen thousand of Karam's fans packed the streets, waiting for her to appear and sing her new material.

Saharni (Charmed) was the kind of album that was a rebirth of the "old Najwa Karam", and took the public by surprise, as they had at this point come to expect contemporary pop from the Shams el-Ghinnieh. The music had all the makings of distinctly Lebanese music: trumbakke solos, traditional wind instruments, much bass and a vibrant singing style – all features far removed from the "western" motif that most artists opted for at the time. Not only had Karam's music changed, but she also sported a new look, which further emphasized that the album was a turnaround. Saharni'''s success was instantaneous, even though there was a lack of video clips for the songs, the album came through on top of the charts and produced a number of major hits, including  Edhak Lil Dounya (Smile to the world), and the title track Saharni (He charmed me).

Karam made a world tour to complement Saharnis success, taking in the Middle East as well as destinations such as France and the US with Wadih el Safi. She also traveled to Australia. Her concert there still holds the record for largest ever recorded concert attendance for an Arabic artist. Karam was presented with a number of awards and achievements in 2003. These include "Highest Selling Album" from Rotana, and award for the "Best singer of Traditional Lebanese Song" from the Lions Club, "Song of the Year": Edhak Lil Donya from Sawt El Ghad Australia, and an honorary award from the Australian Government.

As the New Year came and passed, Karam began work on a new single to be included in her upcoming album. This single would be like no other she had released before. Titled Leish Mgharrab? (Why are you living abroad?) it told of the hardships that people face when having to leave their home country for a better life. Coupled with this harrowing topic, was a revolutionary new music video (directed by Sa'aed el-Marouk), which would transform modern day Beirut into a bleak and harsh wasteland in 2020. The original video – which also contained scenes of citizens protesting against the Lebanese government – was banned from being aired by the Lebanese Parliament. When the clip was edited slightly, it was finally allowed to go to air, along with its song. It hit home with many people, especially those living abroad in countries like Australia and the US. It also sent a direct message to Lebanese politicians, telling them to act on their words.

After a few months, Karam had completed the rest of her new album, Shu Mghaira..!. Like Saharni, it was distinctly Lebanese, but it was more of a modern adaptation, with a reflective and sad overtone. Najwa continued her many live appearances to promote the album, and a notable event for 2004 was her sell-out concert in Carthage, Tunisia where she performed to thousands of enthusiastic fans. The tracks Bi Hawak (In your love) and Shu Mghaira (How you've changed) were shot in an expensive duel video clip which was riddled with special effects. It remained at the number 1 position for 6 weeks on the Rotana Top 20 Chart. The two songs were the most popular from the album, and Karam was voted "Female Artist of the Year" from MusicanaNet.net, which was decided via a large scale internet poll.

2005 and beyond
In the second quarter of 2005, Karam released a new single and video clip called Shu Jani. Shu Jani was a contemporary pop song, with the use of traditional Lebanese instruments. The video was filmed in the Faraya ski resort in Lebanon by director Sa'aed el-Marouk. It was to be on her upcoming 2005 album. The timing of the new clip was criticized in some tabloids, because it was released during the tense electoral season in Lebanon, and the so-called Cedar Revolution (Independence Intifada). It was argued by these tabloids that it was disrespectful for Karam to release new material at such a time. Karam defended herself by putting the claim on her Saudi production company, Rotana, who she says fast-tracked the release against her wishes. Even though there was some controversy surrounding Shu Jani, it fared well with the public.

Due to the prolonged situation in the Lebanon region, Karam's 2005 album was postponed from originally being released in June, then July and then finally postponed until November 2005. However, Karam released another single in late July called Bhebak Walaa which was an upbeat, contemporary/traditional song typical of Karam's usual work. It was a fairly big hit, hitting number one on many internet and radio charts. On 6 September 2005, Karam released the video for Bhebak Walaa, directed by Salim el-Turk.

Kibir'el Hob, (Love Got bigger)
In November 2005, billboards and unipolls all over Beirut were displaying a lady's hand upon a cloudy horizon. No writing was on the posters. The advertisement had the public wondering what message the posters were relaying, and who did the mysterious hand belong to? Soon it was generally concluded that the hand belonged to a recording artist, but there were many conflicting suggestions as to whose it was. Gradually, the billboards had bits of the lady added to the picture, until on 30 November 2005 the "mystery lady" was revealed as Najwa Karam.

On the same day, Karam's 15th studio album, Kibir'el Hob (Love Just Got Greater) was officially released. The album gained widespread attention through its rigorous advertising campaign, which included the billboard posters, many television appearances [on popular variety programs such as Dandana, and Akeed Maestro], and music video clips for singles. Kibir'el Hob topped the highest selling album chart in Lebanon for Rotana during the Christmas sales period, and remained in the number one position through the New Year. In mid April 2006, Karam released a third and last single from the Kibir'el Hob album, accompanied by a video clip, and proved to be among the most popular Arabic songs of the year 2006.

In response to the 2006 Israel-Lebanon conflict, Karam teamed for the first time with popular Lebanese singer/songwriter Melhim Barakat to record the song Rah Yeb2a El Watan. The track was written and composed by Barakat, and called for unity among all Lebanese people. The single was released in late September and was critically acclaimed for its message and vocals, although criticised for its short running time. Plans for another collaboration with Barakat are underway.

2007–2008: Haida Haki, (That's What I'm Talking About) & Aam Bimzah Maak, (I'm Kidding With You)

On 28 May Sawt el Ghad and several other Arab radio stations began to play the new hit "Hayda Haki". This song with a very new style was expected to be a great deal for 2007.

On 6 June 2007 the company Rotana released Najwa's 16th album titled Hayda Haki. A new Lebanese album with Najwa Karam's special flavor in it. This album included 8 excellent songs as usual.

Different kind of styles in each song. A powerful mawal in Raje3 Tes2al 3a Meen and a nice/soft mawal for El hanone. Law ma btekzob is like her 90s songs, Ana Rouh and Nawer Eyami are two of a kind romance songs. Hata Be Ahlamak, Hayda Haki and Behkik are upbeat songs with different styles in each one and a special Najwa Karam's touch. Hayda Haki was the next song (after her 2006–2007 huge hit Shu Hal Hala) that Najwa Karam shot as a video clip with Lebanese director Said el Marouk.

From the First week of the release of Hayda Haki it was the best selling album in Lebanon in UAE and Kwait Number one best selling Album. The Album had huge success from the first week of release in Lebanon, the Gulf, Libya, Syria, Jordan and other Arab countries.

Najwa Karam was a guest on the show Album on MBC 1. On 29 June 2007, she shined on Album's stage, one week before Album's final prime.

In June she released her video clip Hayda Haki, which displayed her character in a romantic atmosphere and love shots and in its first day on the charts she landed on the 1st spot.

Najwa Karam toured the United States and Canada with Lebanese Stars Wael Kfoury and Fadel Shaker, the tour lasted for a little more than a month as they visited major cities and was all success.  The American concerts were in Chicago, San Francisco, Las Vegas, Detroit, New Jersey, Boston and Miami. And in Canada, concerts were in Ottawa, Montreal and Toronto, singing in the biggest and most important venues.

After four days, Karam released a video clip for "Law Ma Btekzob" by the director Fadi Haddad. The song achieved tremendous success across the Middle East. Along with Law Ma Btekzob success, the song Behkeek was achieving unexpected success too in Egypt and Lebanon ranking #2 in both charts for a couple of weeks.

One of Karam's most anticipated appearance on TV show Al Arab (Final), with host Nishan, was aired on 31 May. She sang medley of her old and new songs and added songs for Fairuz, Sabah, Wadih El Safi and Samira Tawfiq. She also sang one of her old mawal "Wainak Ya Ra3i Deni" (Where are you God?) aka "Mawal El Adyan" and it achieved huge success.

On 17 July 2008 Rotana released Karam's 17th studio-album, Am Bimzah Maak (I'm Joking with you). The album received considerable success and positive reviews. The album contained eight songs. One of the most famous Arabic composer Melhim Baraket composed two songs from the album: "Kammil 3ala Rouhi" and "Gatalna El Khof". The album stayed for three months #1 in Virgin Mega Store Lebanon, 4 weeks #1 in UAE Virgin Mega Store, 8 Weeks in Saudi Arabia, etc.; Rotana, Karam's production company, said that Najwa Karam's last album Am Bimzah Maak, was one of the top 3 best-selling (Rotana) albums in the Middle East. It was chosen by Virgin MegaStore Jordan, as Top 3 most selling albums in the year of 2008.

While four songs from Aam Bimza7 Maak; "Am Bimzah Maak", "Enta El Shams", "Amanti Galbi", and "Taa Khabik" were achieving a lot of success all over the Middle East, Karam released her second video clip from her latest album "Ma Bkhabi Aleyk" where she collaborated for the first time with Lebanese young director Randa Aalam.

Karam shot a 3rd video clip from her successful album "Aam Bimza7 Maa" called "Taa Taa Khabik". And it played on many Music channels in the Middle East and received huge success in Lebanon, Maghreb, Syria, Jordan and the Gulf countries.

2009: Khallini Shoufak, (Let Me See You)

In February 2009, Karam attended one of the Middle East's most important concert, Hala Febrayer 09 in Kuwait. She performed a mixture of old and new songs for the very active crowd.

On 9 March, specifically on Mothers Day, Najwa Karam released her anticipated single "El Deni Em" (A mother is a whole world), which received huge success and stayed #1 for three weeks on the Online Magazine "Elaph".

In May 2009, Najwa Karam traveled to Morocco to perform at the Mawazine Festival 2009. Her opening performance attracted a crowd exceeding 90,000.

On 10 June 2009, Rotana released Karam's 18th album, entitled Khallini Shoufak (Let me see you). The album contains eight songs, each with a different style of music and catchy lyrics. It is worth mentioning that along with the lead single  "Khallini Shufak", three other songs are receiving huge success: "Eidak" (your hand), "Allah Yesghello Balo" (may God make him worry), and "Aboos Eynak" (kiss your eye). The remaining songs are: "Wale'"(light the fire), "El Deni Em" (a mother is a whole world), "Albi Masna' Baroud" (my heart is a gun factory), "El Haramy" (the thief). The album is considered to be Karam's strongest return to her original style since Saharny (2003). Karam said, "it's full of folkloric, balady songs, similar to Saharny and her 90s releases". Her video for "Khallini Shoufak" was released around the same time as her CD.

Karam was a guest performer on Star Academy 6's (Lebanon) final prime. She sang "Am Bemzah Ma'ak" (I'm joking with you), "Ta'a Khabeek" (Let me hide you), and her latest single, "Khallini Shoufak" (Let Me See you). She then appeared on Layali El Samar on 25 March 2010 on ABU DHABI TV. Also, Karam was the guest star on Taratata, Dubai TV, and soon after she appeared on the TV show Akher Man Ya3lam.

2010–2011: Bil Rou7, Bil Dam (with soul, with blood) & Lashhad Hobbak (I'll testify for your love)

On 7 May 2010, Sawt El Ghad Radio, Beirut, started playing Karam's new hit "Bil Rou7, Bil Dam" (with soul, with blood). The new hit single was the first song of Karam's that was produced directly out of Rotana in 17 years. The song, along with its video clip, which featured in it the Guinness world record for the largest plate of tabbouleh, sponsored by Karam, were well received and reached great success.

Then on 11 November 2010, Karam released her next single, "Lashhad Hobbak" (I'll beg for your love). Its video clip aired on Rotana Music Channels, attracting a large audience through its classy styles, such as the spider-webbed characteristics. The song became very popular among the masses. Karam wore the beaded full spider-web bodysuit, designed by Lebanese designer Zuhair Murad, that was later worn by Jennifer Lopez, in her music video, "On the Floor". 
 
In late 2010, although there were doubts of a new contract between Karam and Rotana Production Company, after several meetings with Salem El Hendi, Karam agreed to return to Rotana. Haifa Wehbe attended the dinner party which was held after the press conference telling the press that she was glad to accept Karam's invitation and delighted to be part of the celebration.

After Karam decided to postpone her upcoming album, a song called "Wayn" appeared on the internet. The song was verified stolen from the Najwa Karam Office and released without her permission. The song was recorded three years prior in 2009 and was removed from that year's album, Khallini Shoufak. Although illegally released, the song was well-liked, and was played on numerous radio stations. With its slow rhythm and different style, unusual of Karam's music, it reached the top ten singles and became a favorite.

2011: Hal Leile...MaFi Noum (Tonight, There's No Sleep)

On 28 June 2011, Rotana released Hal Leile...MaFi Noum (Tonight...There's No Sleep), Najwa Karam's 19th studio album. "MaFi Noum (There's No Sleep)" and "Shu Hal Leile (What a Night)" were both released as singles before the album's release while, "Law Bas Taaraf" (If You'd Only Know), was released as the third and final single. Three days following its release, the album notched the top spot on Virgin Megastore Charts, replacing Nawal Al Zoghbi's album, Ma'rafsh Leh, which had been dominating the Lebanese charts for five months. Karam is credited as the writer of three of the songs appearing on the album: "Mafi Noum", "Shu Hal Leile", and "Eainy Bi Eainak". The title track and lead single "MaFi Noum", employs innovative "Doum Tac" Derbake notes as a part of its chorus. Karam reiterated in interviews the meaning and significance of the "Doum Tac" music notes and her reasoning behind their usage. It has since become a signature label of Najwa Karam's music.

Two weeks after the album's debut, a 3D music video was released for the title track, "Ma Fi Noum", becoming the first 3D music video in the Middle East. The music video was produced by two professional teams from the US and the UK in collaboration with the Lebanese W&P Production Group. Directed by Waleed Nassif, the video was created by Sony, and produced by Rotana. The opening sequence of the video features Season 1 Arabs' Got Talent contestant, Abdelmalek Al Baljani, from Morocco, in a break dance solo. During his appearance on Arab's Got Talent, Karam was impressed by Al Baljani's abilities and promised on Live TV to cast him in her next video. The three-day shoot took place in Northern Lebanon, at Nahr Ibrahim, in the Kesserwan area of Basateen Al Ossi, Jeita Grotto, and at the studio of Mansourieh. The 3D music video premiered at the ABC Achrafieh theater in Lebanon on 25 July 2011 and was played in 600 3D Sony showrooms and outlets, throughout the Arab world. A 2D version was also released for Television and YouTube. The "MaFi Noum" 3D clip had one of the largest production budgets in the Middle East.

2017: Menni Elak (From Me, To You)

Karam's latest album, Menni Elak, was ranked among Top 4 on iTunes worldwide, and top 1 for five weeks in the Middle East and Arabia countries. It was ranked also top 1 for six months in Virgin Megastore in Lebanon, and it broke the list of the 100 best albums on iTunes Brazil. Menni Elak ranked the top 1 on the Chinese website "Pan European Music". The spread of the album was a reason for Najwa Karam to enter the list of the most listened to singers on Yotta radio in Japan and topped the Malaysian Akshak magazine cover.

On the Amazon World Music site, the album hit the list of the best-selling albums in German, American and British versions. On 21 and 25 June, the songs of the album were broadcast as the first Arabic album on the international British Radio "FM 1 FM" in London, following a poll on Twitter. The song "Ah min el Gharam" from the album, was nominated for the 2017 XLIII Universal Music Award in Spain, while "Habibi Min" got fifth place in the voting finals that lasted more than eight months. All eight songs of the album were entered in the list of "The Hot 100 songs" on Fazboard Iran. After eleven months, "Habibi Min", another song from the album, was ranked number one on iTunes Uzbekistan.

 Discography 

 Studio albums 
 1989: Ya Habayeb 1992: Shams el-Ghinnieh 1993: Ana Ma'akon 1994: Naghmet Hob 1995: Ma Bassmahlak 1996: Hazi Helo 1997: Ma Hada La Hada 1998: Maghroumeh 1999: Rouh Rouhi 2000: Oyoun Qalbi 2001: Nedmaneh 2002: Tahamouni 2003: Saharni 2004: Shu Mghaira..! 2005: Kibir'el Hob 2007: Hayda Haki 2008: Am Bemzah Ma'ak 2009: Khallini Shoufak 2011: Hal Layle... Ma Fi Nom 2017: Menni ElakSingles

 1987: A'ala Zahle Wasselni
 1987: A'al A'alali
 1987: Ya Ghawi
 1987: Batalet Soum W Salli
 1987: El Watan El Ghali
 1987: Largueslo bl Seif
 1989: El Layl Sar Nhar
 1989: El Raqm El Saa'ab
 1996: Jayi Ya Jarash Jayi
 1997: Aezzik Dayem Ya Carthage
 1998: A Droub El Sham
 2000: Ana Jayi Men Kfarhabbayt
 2002: W Kberna (feat. Wadih El Safi)
 2004: Kwaiti Aarabi
 2005: Shu Jani
 2006: Ra7 Yeb2a El Watan (feat. Melhem Barakat)
 2007: Bel San'a (feat. Melhem Barakat)
 2007: Hayda Haki (Rotana Remix)
 2007: Oter El Majd
 2010: Bil Rouh Bil Dam
 2010: Lashhad Hobbak
 2011: Wayn (Leaked Single)
 2012: Isroj Bel Layl Hsanak
 2013: Ykhallili Albak
 2014: Aal Sakhra
 2014: Ya Yomma
 2015: Kelmit Haa'
 2015: Ma Bestaghreb (Song for Morocco)
 2015: Siid L Rijaal
 2015: Bawsit Abel alNawm
 2016: Deni Ya Dana
 2016: Yekhreb Baytak
 2017: Yenaad Aalayk (‘’Menni Elak’’ Bonus Track Single)
 2017: Nehna Chaabak Ya Allah
 2018: YaHo (feat. Adel el Iraqi)
 2018: El Layli Laylitna
 2019: Allah Yekhod Biyadik (Song For Saudi Arabia)
 2019: Mal3oun Abu El Isheg
 2019: Ktir Helou  
 2019: Be3alle2 Mashna2to
 2019: Ba3cha2 Tafasilak
 2020: Beirut
 2020: Maazour Albi
 2020: Zayed Majedha
 2021: Maghroumi 2
 2021: Saher Ouloub
 2022: Helwe El Denye
 2022: Saaa Bayda

Compilations

 2001: The Very Best of Najwa Karam 2006: Greatest Hits 2016: Best of Najwa 2016Live recordings

 2001: Live in Concert''

Festivals and international concerts 

During her career, Najwa Karam has performed hundreds of concerts worldwide:

 1991: Damascus International Fair – Syria 
 1991: Al Bustan Palace (Opera House)- Sultanate of Oman
 1992: International Festival of Carthage – Tunisia 
 1992: Damascus International Festivals – Syria 
 1993: Cobo Arena Detroit (Cobo Center) -USA (Over 11000 people) 
 1993: Amphitheatre of El Jem – Tunisia (2 Concerts) 
 1993: Festival international de Monastir – Tunisia
 1993: Benlton International Club – Lebanon 
 1994: Khalifa International Tennis and Squash Complex – Qatar
 1994: Al Assad Sports City Stadium (Al-Assad Stadium) – Syria (Over 40000 people)
 1994: Benlton International Club – Lebanon 
 1994: Ritz Theatre & Performing Arts Center New Jersey – USA
 1995: Palais des congrès de Paris – France 
 1995: Fuheis Festivals – Jordan
 1995: Sarafand Square – Lebanon (More Than 20000 People)
 1995: Palais Des Festivals Cannes – France 
 1995: Damascus International Fair – Syria 
 1995: Damascus International Festivals – Syria 
 1995: Aley Amphitheatre – Lebanon 
 1995: Benlton International Club – Lebanon
 1995: Baabda Amphitheatre – Lebanon 
 1995: Art Theatre Long Beach California – USA
 1996: Capitol Theater Düsseldorf – Germany 
 1996: Jerash International Festivals – Jordan (3 Concerts) 
 1996: Cairo International Convention Centre – Egypt 
 1996: Bahrain International Circuit 
1996: Royal Albert Hall London – UK
 1997: People's Hall, Tripoli – Libya 
 1997: International Festival of Carthage – Tunisia (2 Concerts)
 1997: Aley Amphitheatre – Lebanon
 1997: Beirut Shopping Festivals – Lebanon
 1997: Qurum Amphitheater Muscat – sultanate of Oman
 1998: International Festival of Carthage – Tunisia
 1998: Al Shaab Stadium – Iraq
 1998: Al Forusiyah National Club – Iraq
 1998: Al-Jalaa Stadium – Syria
 1998: Damascus International Festivals – Syria
 1998: Zahle City Amphitheatre – Lebanon
 1998: Aley Amphitheatre – Lebanon
 1998: Marina Amphitheatre – Egypt
 1998: Cultural Palace Theatre – Jordan
 1999: Damascus International Fair – Syria
 1999: Damascus International Festivals
 1999: Fayhaa International Stadium – Syria
 1999: Umayyad Square – Syria (Over 100000 people)
 1999: Bahrain International Exhibition Convention Centre
 1999: The Carousel Theater Massachusetts – USA
 1999: Circus Maximus Theatre Philadelphia – USA
 1999: Abusta Square Tripoli – Libya
 2000: International Festival of Carthage – Tunisia (2 Concerts)
 2000: Amphitheatre Sidi Mansour Sfax – Tunisia (16000 people)
 2000: Sousse Amphitheatre – Tunisia
 2000: Bizerte Amphitheatre – Tunisia (130000 people)
 2000: Festival international de Monastir – Tunisia
 2001: Dubai World Trade Centre – UAE
 2001: Arena Theatre Amman – Jordan 
 2001: Hala February Festivals – Kuwait
 2001: Casino Du Liban Salle Des Ambassadeurs – Lebanon
 2001: Timgad International Festivals – Algeria
 2001: Doha International Festivals – Qatar
 2001: Sidi Ferj Amphitheatre Kazif – Algeria
 2001: Abusta Square Tripoli – Libya (2 Concerts)
 2001: Al Abbasiyyin Stadium – Syria (Over 50000 people)
 2002: The foot of Egyptians Pyramids – Egypt
 2002: Creek Park Amphitheatre Dubai – UAE
 2003: Star Square Beirut – Lebanon (Over 30000 people)
 2003: Jerash International Festivals – Jordan (2 Concerts)
 2003: Tyre International Festivals – Lebanon
 2004: International Festival of Carthage – Tunisia
 2004: Bizerte Amphitheatre – Tunisia
 2004: Damascus International Fair – Syria
 2004: Bahrain International Circuit
 2004: Hala February Festivals – Kuwait
 2004: Amphitheatre Sidi Mansour Sfax – Tunisia
 2004: Zahle City Amphitheatre – Lebanon
 2004: Palais Des Festivals Cannes – France
 2005: El Menzah Sports Palace – Tunisia (2 Concerts)
 2005: Zouk Mikael Amphitheatre – Lebanon
 2006: Cultural Palace Theatre – Jordan
 2006: Royal Cultural Center – Jordan 
 2006: Sabratha Amphitheatre – Libya
 2006: Royal Albert Hall London – UK
 2006: Festival international de Monastir – Tunisia
 2006: Festival international de Gafsa – Tunisia
 2006: Amphitheatre Sidi Mansour Sfax – Tunisia
 2006: Timgad International Festivals – Algeria
 2006: Sidi Ferj Amphitheatre Kazif – Algeria
 2007: Boch Center Shubert Theatre Boston – USA
 2007: Jerash International Festivals – Jordan
 2007: Sydney Olympic Park – Australia
 2007: Fox Theatre Detroit – USA
 2007: Hala February Festivals – Kuwait
 2007: Doha International Festivals
 2007: Ritz Theatre & Performing Arts Center New Jersey – USA
 2008: International Festival of Carthage – Tunisia
 2008: Amphitheatre Sidi Mansour Sfax – Tunisia
 2008: Bizerte Amphitheatre – Tunisia
 2008: Jableh Roman Amphitheatre – Syria
 2008: Bahrain International Circuit
 2008: Casino Du Liban Salle Des Ambassadeurs – Lebanon
 2008: Emirates Palace Abu Dhabi – UAE
 2008: Tempodrom Berlin – Germany
 2008: Ericsson Globe Arena Stockholm – Sweden (Over 11.000 People)
 2008: Dubai International Film Festival – UAE
 2009: Sidi Ferj Amphitheatre Kazif – Algeria
 2009: Timgad International Festivals – Algeria
 2009: Hala February Festivals – Kuwait
 2009: Mawazine International Festivals – Morocco (Over 90000 people)
 2009: Jableh Roman Amphitheatre – Syria
 2009: Beirut Forum – Lebanon
 2009: Damascus International Fair
 2009: Al Dhafra Theater Dubai – UAE
 2009: Rashid Karami Cultural Center Tripoli – Lebanon
 2010: Byblos International Festival – Lebanon
 2010: Damascus International Fair – Syria
 2010: Doha International Festivals – Qatar
 2010: Abu Dhabi National Exhibition Centre – UAE
 2010: Tadmor International Festivals – Syria
 2011: Jerash International Festivals – Jordan
 2011: Hope Square Agadir – Morocco (Over 120000 People)
 2011: Sidi Ferj Amphitheatre Kazif – Algeria
 2011: Timgad International Festivals – Algeria
 2011: The Corniche Abu Dhabi – UAE (Over 50000 People)
 2011: Zahle City Amphitheatre – Lebanon
 2011: Casino Du Liban Salle Des Ambassadeurs – Lebanon
 2011: State Theater Tetouan – Morocco (Over 40000 People)
 2011: Sound Board Theater Detroit – USA 
 2012: Hosny Chakroun Theatre Wahran – Algeria
 2012: International Festival of Carthage – Tunisia
 2012: Cannes Film Festivals – France (First Arabic Singer Ever participate to this Festival)
 2012: Stipes Tower Amphitheater – UAE
 2013: Jerash International Festivals – Jordan
 2013: Mawazine International Festivals – Morocco (The most popular Female Arabic Singer concert with over 180000 people)
 2013: Sidi Ferj Amphitheatre Kazif – Algeria
 2013: Timgad International Festivals – Algeria
 2013: Casablanca International Festivals – Morocco(Over 150000 People)
 2013: Sporting Monte-Carlo – France
2014: Sidi Ferj Amphitheatre Kazif – Algeria
 2014: Djemila International Festivals – Algeria
 2014: Hala February Festivals – Kuwait
 2014: Palais de la culture d'Abidjan – Ivory Coast
 2014: Jerash International Festivals – Jordan
 2014: Al Madina History Theatre – Lebanon
 2014: The Fillmore Theatre Detroit – USA
 2015: State Theater Tetouan – Morocco (Over 60000 people)
 2015: Hala February Festivals – Kuwait
 2015: Dubai Media City Amphitheatre – UAE
 2015: Caesars Palace Atlantic City – USA
 2015: Bahrain International Circuit
 2015: Cedars International Festival – Lebanon
 2015: Biel Beirut Holidays – Lebanon
 2016: Jerash International Festivals – Jordan
 2016: Zenith Arena Constantine – Algeria
 2016: International Festival of Carthage – Tunisia
 2016: Amphitheatre Sidi Mansour Sfax – Tunisia
 2016: Sousse Amphitheatre – Tunisia
 2016: Hosny Chakroun Theatre Wahran – Algeria
 2016: Timgad International Festivals – Algeria
 2016: Sidi Ferj Amphitheatre Kazif – Algeria
 2016: Leverkuzen Arena – Germany
 2016: Palais 12 Brussels – Belgium
 2016: Gothenburg Square – Sweden (Over 45000 People)
 2016: du Arena and Forum – Yas Island UAE
 2017: Djemila International Festivals – Algeria
 2017: Sydney Olympic Park – Australia
 2017: Abdali Boulevard Square Amman – Jordan
 2017: Mawazine International Festivals – Morocco (Over 100000 people)
 2017: Bahrain International Circuit
 2017: Cedars International Festival – Lebanon
 2017: Olympia Hall Paris – France
 2017: Melbourne Convention Centre – Australia
 2017: Al Marooj Theatre Salala – Oman
 2017: Beverly Hills California – USA
 2017: Falaysi Theatre Algiers – Algeria
 2017: Zenith Arena Constantine – Algeria
 2018: Park Theatre Monte Carlo Las Vegas – USA
 2018: Oak Ville The Meeting House Toronto – Canada
 2018: ST. Denis Theatre Montreal – Canada
 2018: Kuwait Opera House
 2018: Al Majaz Amphitheatre Sharjah – UAE
 2018: The Main Cultural Stage, Global Village Dubai – UAE
 2018: Palais des congrès de Paris – France
 2018: Casino Du Liban Salle Des Ambassadeurs – Lebanon
 2018: Stockholm Waterfront Congress Centre – Sweden
 2019: Kuwait Opera House
 2019: Green Hall Khobar – Saudi Arabia
 2019: Ayva Center Huston – USA
 2019: Atlantis Theatre – The Bahamas
 2019: Glendale Renaissance Hall Arizona – USA 
 2019: Mawazine International Festivals – Morocco (Over 100.0000 people)
 2019: Talal Maddah Theatre – Saudi Arabia (The first Arab singer to sing "Tallah Madah" stage) 
 2019: Fuheis Festivals – Jordan 
 2019: Boulevard Stage Riyadh – Saudi Arabia
 2019: Royal Opera House Muscat – Oman (2 Concerts)
 2020: Al Hamra International Exhibition & Conference Center – UAE

Awards and achievements

See also
 Music of Lebanon

References

External links
 

Living people
20th-century Lebanese women singers
Lebanese film actresses
Lebanese television actresses
21st-century Lebanese women singers
Lebanese Maronites
People from Zahle
Rotana Records artists
1966 births
Universal Music Group artists
Singers who perform in Classical Arabic
Singers who perform in Egyptian Arabic